Murray Jonathan Sanders (April 11, 1910 - June 29, 1987) was an American bacteriologist and military officer who was involved with the U.S. Army's biological warfare program during World War II. He is best known as the U.S. officer who convinced General Douglas MacArthur to grant legal immunity to members of the infamous Japanese Unit 731 chemical warfare research unit, despite the unit's practice of unethical human experimentation.

Early life and education 
Murray Sanders was born in Chelsea, Massachusetts on April 11, 1910. He studied microbiology at Rush Medical College in Chicago, graduating in 1931 with an MD in the field. Sanders also received further training at Columbia University, eventually becoming a professor of microbiology there and engaging in polio research.

Military service 
Sanders was drafted into the army in 1943 and was stationed at Fort Detrick, where he became involved with the army's research and development of biological weapons. Sanders performed a number of classified investigations at Detrick, and proposed the use of weapons infused with botulism. He also warned that the Japanese Empire was planning to wage biological warfare on the United States through the dropping of anthrax-infused bombs on targets in the Pacific Coast.

Granting of immunity to Unit 731 
Following the surrender of Japan and the Allied occupation that followed, Sanders was called upon by General Douglas MacArthur to head an investigation into Japan's biological warfare activity. Sanders traveled to Japan aboard the ship Sturgess, arriving in Yokohama in September 1945. Sanders was assigned with the interrogation and interviewing of several Japanese scientists and military personnel involved with the Imperial Japanese Army's chemical warfare research and development unit, Unit 731, which operated in Harbin, Manchuria and engaged in practices of illegal human experimentation from 1932 to 1945. Among those interviewed was bacteriologist Ryoichi Naito, who oversaw many of Unit 731's experiments, and also served as a translator for Sanders while interrogating the other interviewees. Initially, Naito and the other persons interviewed by Sanders denied any accusations of human experimentation, stating that the Japanese military had engaged solely in defensive research, and that experimenting on humans was "clearly against humanity". After Sanders threatened to hand those involved with Unit 731 over to the Soviet Union, however, Naito agreed to send Sanders a manuscript which detailed their activities whilst headquartered at Harbin.

After reviewing the data provided by those involved in Unit 731, Sanders presented the findings to MacArthur, stating that he believed the data to contain valuable information that must not end up in Soviet hands. Knowing that the physicians had fled their headquarters in order to avoid prosecution by the Soviets for war crimes, Sanders suggested that MacArthur grant the physicians involved legal immunity against any war crimes charges in exchange for their data. MacArthur agreed with Sanders's proposal, believing the data “almost incalculable and incredibly valuable to the United States”, and agreed to grant the unit's physicians, including head scientist Shirō Ishii, immunity from prosecution as long as they exchanged their data with only the Americans. Following the acquittal, Sanders invited Ishii to Fort Detrick to lecture officers on the findings made by Unit 731.

Sanders has been harshly criticized for his proposal to grant amnesty to Unit 731's members in spite of the atrocities they committed. He later testified before U.S. Congress regarding the failure of the Tokyo War Crimes Tribunal to prosecute many Japanese war criminals. Sanders defended his decision in press interviews, stating that he had been "duped" and outsmarted by Naito and Ishii. Historian Sheldon Harris has also defended Sanders, calling him "ambitious but naïve", and claiming that he had "missed the trail leading to Ishii and others".

Civilian career 
While in Japan, Sanders contracted a serious case of tuberculosis, and was transferred back to Fort Detrick. He left the army in 1949 following his recovery and became Chairman of the Department of Medical Research at the University of Miami, a position which he held until 1958. He was among the founders of Miami's Variety Children's Hospital.

During his time working at the University of Miami, Sanders proposed a potential treatment for amyotrophic lateral sclerosis (ALS) using what he called a "Modified Neurotoxin" (MNT) derived from the zootoxins in snake venom. Although Sanders was nominated in 1966 for a Nobel Prize in Medicine for his efforts, his treatment would later be criticized as ineffective by a number of physicians; a 1980 study by doctors Victor Rivera, Martin Grabois, and William Deaton found that Sanders's treatment had a "lack of clinical effectiveness" and "did not demonstrate any benefit from administration of modified snake venom to patients with ALS". Sanders opened the Sanders Medical Research Foundation (SMRF) in Boca Raton, Florida in 1973, in which he treated patients with ALS until his retirement from medical research in 1983. Sanders would also administer MNT treatment on test subjects in Havana as a possible remedy for polio.

Sanders was one of the first scientists to identify and experiment with adenoviral keratoconjunctivitis, a viral infection of the eye. As a result, the condition became informally known as Sanders disease; however, this terminology is no longer used by ophthalmologists.

Sanders died on June 29, 1987, at his home in Delray Beach, Florida, at the age of 77. He is buried at Arlington National Cemetery.

References 

1910 births
1987 deaths